Marvin Hagler vs. Sugar Ray Leonard, billed as The Super Fight, was a professional boxing match contested on April 6, 1987 for the WBC and The Ring middleweight titles.

Background
In the late summer of 1986, negotiations began for a proposed super fight between long-reigning undisputed middleweight champion Marvelous Marvin Hagler and former two-weight champion Sugar Ray Leonard. Leonard had fought only once since his first professional retirement in 1982, defeating Kevin Howard in 1984, retiring again immediately following the fight after being dissatisfied with his performance. In March 1986, Hagler defeated John Mugabi via 11th round knockout, though Mugabi gave Hagler a tough fight and swelled his right eye. Leonard was in attendance of the Hagler–Mugabi fight and after seeing Hagler having slower speed than usual against Mugabi, thought he could beat Hagler, and in May 1986, Leonard announced that he would come out of retirement only to fight Hagler. 

Hagler was initially reluctant to fight Leonard, announcing in July 1986 that a fight with Leonard wouldn't happen as he was "seriously thinking of retirement." By the following month, Hagler had a change of heart and agreed to face Leonard in 1987. Hagler was guaranteed $12 million plus a percentage of the revenue, while Leonard was guaranteed $11 million plus 50 percent of the closed circuit television rights in Maryland and the District of Columbia. Hagler ended up with around $20 million and Leonard with around $12 million. 

The Leonard camp initially proposed a ten round, non-title fight. Leonard insisted on three conditions for the fight that would be crucial to his strategy; first the ring was to be 22x22ft instead of a smaller ring; second the gloves were to be 10 ounces rather than 8 ounces; and third the fight was to be over 12 rounds instead of the 15 rounds favoured by Hagler. Mike Trainer, Leonard's lawyer and advisor, stated that it was "12 rounds or no fight." In return for accepting these conditions, Hagler was offered a large share of the purse. Hagler had previously held the middleweight title belts of all three major sanctioning bodies, the WBA, WBC and IBF. While the WBC agreed to sanction the bout against Leonard, the WBA stripped Hagler of their title after he chose to face Leonard instead of their mandatory challenger Herol Graham. The IBF, while keeping Hagler as their champion, refused to sanction the fight against Leonard, and said that the IBF middleweight title would be declared vacant if Hagler lost to Leonard.

In a poll of sportswriters before the fight, 46 out of 50 picked Hagler to win. Leonard was expected to struggle because of his long lay-off and having never had a fight at middleweight before. Unknown to Hagler or the media at the time, in preparation for the fight Leonard had secretly engaged in four warm-up bouts in private with "top-20-type opponents, against whom he had gone 4–0 with two KOs".

The fight
In what would go down to be among the most controversial fights in boxing history, Leonard would ultimately earn a split decision victory. Hagler started the fight abandoning his usual southpaw stance in favor of an orthodox stance, which would prove costly as he lost the first two rounds on all three judges' scorecards. By round three, Hagler switched to starting rounds in his normal southpaw stance. Hagler would spend most of the fight as the aggressor, while Leonard would pepper Hagler with combinations before retreating away. During the last 30 seconds of each round, Leonard would attack Hagler with a flurry of punches in an effort to "steal" the rounds on the scorecards. Overall, Leonard landed 306 of his 629 thrown punches (49%) compared to Hagler's 291 out of 792 (37%).

Two judges had the fight close, seven rounds to five each way, with judge Lou Filippo scoring the fight 115–113 for Hagler, and judge Dave Moretti scoring the fight 115–113 for Leonard. The third judge, JoJo Guerra, had Leonard winning by a lopsided score of 118–110, having had Leonard winning 10 rounds and Hagler winning only 2 rounds. Guerra's scorecard was widely derided in the media following the bout. Guerra later acknowledged that he made a mistake and should have scored two more rounds for Hagler.

|  style="width:28%; text-align:center;"| Preceded byKO9 Kevin Howard
|  style="width:44%; text-align:center;"| Sugar Ray Leonard's boutsApril 7, 1987
|  style="width:28%; text-align:center;"| Succeeded by KO9 Donny Lalonde
|-
|  style="width:28%; text-align:center;"| Preceded byKO11 John Mugabi
|  style="width:44%; text-align:center;"| Marvelous Marvin Hagler's boutsApril 7, 1987
|  style="width:28%; text-align:center;"| Retired

Scorecards

The scorecards from the ringside press and broadcast media attest to the polarizing views and opinions of the fight:

Aftermath
Hagler requested a rematch but Leonard chose to retire again (the third of five high-profile retirements announced by Leonard during his professional boxing career), having said he would do so beforehand. In June 1988, 14 months after their fight, Hagler announced his retirement from boxing, declaring that he was "tired of waiting" for Leonard to grant him a rematch. Just a month after Hagler's retirement, Leonard announced another boxing comeback to fight against WBC light-heavyweight champion Donny Lalonde at the 168lbs super-middleweight limit. In 1990, Leonard finally offered Hagler a rematch which reportedly would have earned him $15m, but he declined. By then, Hagler had settled down into a new life as an actor in Italy and was now uninterested in his past boxing life. Hagler said "A while ago, yeah, I wanted him so bad, but I'm over that." At the 1994 Consumer Electronics Show Hagler and Leonard had a mock rematch by playing against each other in the video game Boxing Legends of the Ring, and claimed that an actual rematch was being planned.

This would also be Leonard's last fight with long-time trainer and cornerman Angelo Dundee, who had worked with Leonard his entire professional career. Dundee felt insulted that he was only paid $150,000 (1.25%) from Leonard's $12 million purse and declined to be in Leonard's corner for his next fight against Donny Lalonde unless he had a contract, which was refused.

Fight card

References

1987 in boxing
Boxing in Las Vegas
Boxing on HBO
Hagler
April 1987 sports events in the United States